The Bend–Prineville, OR Combined Statistical Area (CSA) is a Combined Statistical Area consisting of Oregon's Deschutes and Crook counties. Deschutes County is designated as the Bend Metropolitan Statistical Area and Crook County is designated as the Prineville Micropolitan Statistical Area.

References

Metropolitan areas of Oregon
Combined statistical areas of the United States